Cajuzinho  (from caju, "cashew"; literally, "little cashew") is a popular sweet with an almost ubiquitous presences in Brazilian parties. It is made of peanuts, cashew nuts and sugar and is shaped like a tiny cashew, although it does taste strongly of peanut.

See also
 List of Brazilian dishes
 List of Brazilian sweets and desserts
 Beijinho
 Brigadeiro
 Olho-de-sogra

References

External links
 Cajuzinho (Brazilian peanut sweets). Allrecipes.

Brazilian confectionery
Cashew dishes
Peanut dishes
Almond dishes